The Continental Cup 1997–98 was the first edition of the IIHF Continental Cup. The season started on September 19, 1997, and finished on December 28, 1997.

The tournament was won by TJ VSŽ Košice, who won the final group.

Preliminary round

Group A
(Székesfehérvár, Hungary)

Group A standings

Group B
(Jesenice, Slovenia)

Group B standings

Group C
(Belgrade, Yugoslavia)

Group C standings

Group D
(Riga, Latvia)

Group D standings

Group E
(Miercurea Ciuc, Romania)

Group E standings

First Group Stage

Group F
(Herning, Denmark)

Group F standings

Group G
(Nijmegen, Netherlands)

Group G standings

Group H
(Ljubljana, Slovenia)

Group H standings

Group J
(Nowy Targ, Poland)

Group J standings

Group K
(Tartu, Estonia)

Group K standings

Group L
(Magnitogorsk, Russia)

Group L standings

 Eisbären Berlin,
 Grenoble MH,
 TJ VSŽ Košice,
 HC Železárny Třinec,
 Polymir Novopolotsk,
 Salavat Yulaev Ufa,        :    bye

Second Group Stage

Group M
(Berlin, Germany)

Group M standings

Group N
(Třinec, Czech Republic)

Group N standings

Group O
(Novopolotsk, Belarus)

Group O standings

 Ilves    :  bye

Final Group Stage
(Tampere, Finland)

Final Group standings

References
 Continental Cup 1998

1997–98 in European ice hockey
IIHF Continental Cup